Pristaulacus flavicrurus is a species of wasp in the family Aulacidae. It is found in North America.

References

Further reading

 

Parasitic wasps
Articles created by Qbugbot
Insects described in 1901
Evanioidea